Lanneplaà is a commune in the Pyrénées-Atlantiques department in south-western France.

The inhabitants of the commune are known as Lanneplanais or Lanneplanaises.

Geography

Location
Lanneplaà is located some 5 km south-west of Orthez.

Access
Access to the commune is by road D23 from Orthez and by road D267. « Route de Sainte-Suzanne » is another access. The A64 autoroute passes in Orthez the nearest exit being Exit  some 9 km north-east  of the commune. The commune is mostly farmland with scattered forests.

Hydrography
The commune is crossed by a tributary of Laà, the stream of Moulins, and a tributaryof Saleys, the arriou of Mondran.

Places and hamlets

 Baraillot
 Bédat
 Bonnecase
 Bosc
 Bounobre
 Bouzoum
 Bracot
 Cabes
 Cambran
 Camdeborde
 Campagne
 Cassiau
 Cassou
 Caubeigt
 Cossié
 Couyet
 Daban
 Goeytes
 Gréchès
 Hau
 Hittos
 Jannette
 Labièle
 Laborde
 Labourdette
 Lacabane
 Lacoste
 Lahourcade
 Lalanne
 Lasserre
 Laubaret
 Laya
 Montardon
 Moulin (le)
 Payrot
 Peyran
 Peyroulou
 Poey
 Poundic
 Pouquet
 Pourére
 Poursioubes
 Sarrail
 Sarrouille

Neighbouring communes and villages
 Salles-Mongiscard North at 4.21 km
 Orthez Northeast at 5.03 km
 L'Hôpital-d'Orion Southwest at 3.72 km
 Ozenx-Montestrucq South at 2.88 km

Distances are calculated as the crow flies compared to neighboring villages town halls

Toponymy

Lanneplaà as for origin the Gascon lana (resulting from the Gaulish language landa, "lande"(moor)) and plana ("plane" ("flat")).

Lanneplaà thus indicates a plain of Meadow.

History

Paul Raymond noted that the municipality had a Lay Abbey, vassal of the Viscounts of Béarn.

On 1385, Lanneplaà depended on the bailiwick of Larbaig and there were 39 fires.

Administration

Demography

Economy

Culture and heritage

Facilities

See also
Communes of the Pyrénées-Atlantiques department

References

Communes of Pyrénées-Atlantiques